Georges Henri Joseph Mollard (25 April 1902 – 2 November 1986) was a sailor from France, who represented his country at the 1924 Summer Olympics in Le Havre, France. Mollard took the bronze in the 8 Metre.

References

Sources
 

French male sailors (sport)
Sailors at the 1924 Summer Olympics – 8 Metre
Olympic sailors of France
1902 births
1986 deaths
Olympic bronze medalists for France
Olympic medalists in sailing
Medalists at the 1924 Summer Olympics